The Missing Million is a 1923 crime novel by the British writer Edgar Wallace.

"The Missing Million" centers around the disappearance of millionaire Rex Walton on the eve of his wedding. After Walton disappears, a chain of weird and violent events begin to occur.

Film adaptation
In 1942 the novel was adapted into a British film of the same title starring Linden Travers and John Warwick.

References

Bibliography
 Goble, Alan. The Complete Index to Literary Sources in Film. Walter de Gruyter, 1999.

External links
 

1923 British novels
British crime novels
British novels adapted into films
Novels by Edgar Wallace